The 1973 Irish presidential election was held on Wednesday, 30 May 1973. The outgoing president Éamon de Valera was ineligible for re-election after serving two terms in office. Former Tánaiste Erskine H. Childers, nominated by Fianna Fáil, was elected as president of Ireland, defeating Fine Gael deputy leader, Tom O'Higgins, who had come within 1% of defeating Éamon de Valera in the 1966 presidential election.

Nomination process
Under Article 12 of the Constitution of Ireland, a candidate for president could be nominated by:
at least twenty of the 204 serving members of the Houses of the Oireachtas, or
at least four of 31 councils of the administrative counties, including county boroughs.

On 25 April, the Minister for Local Government made the order for the presidential election, with noon on 8 May as the date for nominations, and 30 May as the date of polling.

Campaign
O'Higgins was approved as the Fine Gael candidate on 31 January. Childers was approved as the Fianna Fáil candidate on 6 April. George Colley was director of elections for Childers. O'Higgins was the early favourite to win, with odds of 1/2, against 6/4 for Childers.

Result

References

1973 elections in the Republic of Ireland
Presidential
Presidential elections in Ireland
May 1973 events in Europe